This timeline covers the main wars, battles and engagements and related issues for the Scottish, English and British Army, from 1537 to the present. See also Timeline of British diplomatic history.

1500–1599
1537The Overseers of the Fraternity or Guild of St George received a Royal Charter from Henry VIII on 25 August, when Letters Patent were received authorising them to establish a perpetual corporation for the defence of the realm to be known as the Fraternity or Guild of Artillery of Longbows, Crossbows and Handgonnes. This body was known by a variety of names since, but today is called the Honourable Artillery Company, and is the oldest regiment in continuous service in the British Army.
1539The Royal Monmouthshire Royal Engineer Regiment is first mustered before becoming a militia force for the county of Monmouth. When the new Police was formed in the 19th Century, the regiment switched to the Royal Engineers Reserve, becoming the Royal Monmouthshire Royal Engineers Militia the senior regiment of the Reserve Army.
1572The Buffs were formed from London's urban militia to support the Protestants in Holland, where they remained until the outbreak of the Anglo-Dutch war in 1665, at which point they were disbanded for refusing the oath of loyalty to the Dutch States General. They fled to England and reformed as 'The Holland Regiment' in the British Army. The unit is now part of the Princess of Wales's Royal Regiment.

1600–1699

1633The Royal Regiment of Foot (later the Royal Scots) is placed on the Scottish Establishment, later becoming the oldest infantry regiment in the British Army.
1642Marquis of Argyll's Royal Regiment was raised by Archibald Campbell, 1st Marquess of Argyll for service in Ireland, renamed in 1650 Lyfe Guard of Foot and reformed as the Scottish Regiment of Foot Guards in 1661 (later the Scots Guards).
1650George Monck's Regiment is formed (later the Coldstream Guards), becoming the oldest infantry regiment in continuous service in the British Army but not under the monarch.
1656Lord Wentworth's Regiment is formed (later the Grenadier Guards), later becoming the most senior infantry regiment in the British Army because of the long serving loyalty to the monarch during the English Civil War.
26 January 1661King Charles II issues warrant, becoming the acknowledged beginning of the British Army. This concerned an assemblage of English regiments and Scottish regiments brought south with Charles II. The British Army would not formally exist, however, for another 46 years, as Scotland and England remained two independent states, each with its own Army.
1 October 1661The Tangier Regiment is formed, later The Princess of Wales's Royal Regiment, the most senior English line infantry regiment in the British Army.
1684The English withdraw from the Colony of Tangier.
1688The War of the Grand Alliance begins.

1700–1799
1702War of the Spanish Succession begins.
1707Kingdom of Great Britain is formed. Scottish and English armies merged to create the British Army.
1722Royal Regiment of Artillery is formed.
1742War of the Austrian Succession begins.
1743Battle of Dettingen, King George II becomes the last British monarch to lead his troops into battle.
1746Battle of Culloden, The British Army, made from Scottish,English and Irish soldiers and led by the Duke of Cumberland, fights the last major battle on British mainland soil against French supported Scottish rebel Jacobites.
1751A numerical system is introduced into the Army, such as 1st Regiment of Foot, 2nd Regiment of Foot, etc.
1755Seven Years' War begins.
1759Battle of Minden, the Duke of Brunswick leads an Anglo-German army against the French.
1759British forces, led by General James Wolfe, take French Quebec.
1775American War of Independence begins.
17 June Battle of Bunker Hill
1776British victory at the Battle of Long Island.
1777British victory at the Battle of Brandywine.
1777British defeat at the Battle of Saratoga.
1781British defeat at the siege of Yorktown.
1793War on revolutionary France declared
1795Capture of Ceylon.
1796slave forces in Haiti led by Toussaint L'ouverture British Forces defeated
1798Large-scale rebellion in Ireland.
1799Capture of Seringapatam.

1800-1898
1801The United Kingdom of Great Britain and Ireland is formed.
French Revolutionary Wars (A campaign to expel a French invasion force in Egypt) takes place.
1803The Napoleonic Wars begin.
1803Second Anglo-Maratha War begins, ends 1805
1 September Battle of Aligarh
11 September Battle of Delhi
23 September Battle of Assaye
1 NovemberBattle of Laswari
28 November Battle of Argaon
15 DecemberBattle of Gawilghur
1806Seizure of the Cape of Good Hope.
An abortive (initially unauthorised) invasion of Spanish South America begins.
1808The Peninsular War begins.
16 JanuaryBattle of Corunna
1810
24 JulyBattle of the Côa
25 JulySiege of Almeida (1810)
27 SeptemberBattle of Bussaco
1811
19 FebruaryBattle of the Gebora
3 AprilBattle of Sabugal
14 AprilSiege of Almeida (1811)
3 MayBattle of Fuentes de Onoro
16 MayBattle of Albuera
25 MayBattle of Usagre
28 OctoberBattle of Arroyo dos Molinos
1812The War of 1812 against the United States begins.
7 JanuarySiege of Ciudad Rodrigo
16 MarchBattle of Badajoz (1812)
11 AprilBattle of Villagarcia
11 JuneBattle of Maguilla
22 JulyBattle of Salamanca
23 JulyBattle of Garcia Hernandez
11 AugustBattle of Majadahonda
19 SeptemberSiege of Burgos
23 OctoberBattle of Venta del Pozo
1813
21 JuneBattle of Vitoria
7 JulySiege of San Sebastián
25 JulyBattle of the Pyrenees
25 JulyBattle of Roncesvalles (1813)
25 JulyBattle of Maya
28 JulyBattle of Sorauren
7 OctoberBattle of the Bidassoa (1813)
19 NovemberBattle of Nivelle
9 DecemberBattle of the Nive
1814The Gurkha War begins.
15 FebruaryBattle of Garris
27 FebruaryBattle of Orthez
10 AprilBattle of Toulouse (1814)
14 AprilBattle of Bayonne
1815
8 JanuaryBattle of New Orleans
16 JuneBattle of Quatre Bras
18 June The Battle of Waterloo takes place, ending in defeat for the French.
1819
16 August The Peterloo Massacre takes place.
1839First Anglo-Afghan War begins ends 1842
23 JulyBattle of Ghazni
SeptemberSiege of Kahun
1842
6 JanuaryBattle of Gandamak
15 JanuaryMassacre of Elphinstone's Army
AugustBattle of Kabul (1842)
1854The Crimean War begins; ends in 1856.
19 SeptemberThe siege of Sevastopol begins.
20 SeptemberThe Battle of Alma takes place.
25 October The Battle of Balaklava takes place; Charge of the Light Brigade.
5 NovemberThe Battle of Inkerman takes place.
1855
8 September The siege of Sevastopol ends.
1857The Indian Mutiny begins.
30 MayIndian rebels begin the siege of Delhi, siege of Lucknow
5 JuneSiege of Cawnpore begins
 8 JuneBattle of Badli-ki-Serai, siege of Delhi
30 JuneSiege of Lucknow begins, Battle of Chinhat
25 AugustBattle of Najafgarh
11 OctoberBattle of Agra
19 NovemberSecond Battle of Cawnpore
1858
 Central India Campaign (1858)
1 MarchCapture of Lucknow
1859Due to fear of invasion by France, a volunteer movement begins, known as the Volunteer Rifle Corps.
1870The Army withdraws from Australia and New Zealand.
1871The Army adopts the Martini-Henry rifle, replacing the Snider.
Abolition of the purchase of commission.
1878 Second Anglo-Afghan War begins, ends 1880
21 NovemberBattle of Ali Masjid
15 DecemberSiege of the Sherpur Cantonment
1879The Anglo-Zulu War takes place.
22 JanuaryBritish force defeated at Battle of Isandlwana.
The defence of Rorke's Drift begins; eleven Victoria Crosses would be gained in the process.
1880
19 AprilBattle of Ahmed Khel
27 JulyBattle of Maiwand
1 SeptemberBattle of Kandahar
20 DecemberFirst Boer War begins ends 23 March 1888
20 DecemberAction at Bronkhorstspruit takes place
1881Mahdist War begins, ends 1889
28 JanuaryBattle of Laing's Nek
1 JulyGeneral Order 70, the culmination of the Cardwell-Childers reforms of the Army's organisation, came into effect.
1884
13 MarchBattle of Tamai
22 MarchBattle of Tofrek
1885
JanuaryBattle of Abu Klea
28 JanuaryGeneral Charles George Gordon is killed by Mahommed Ahmed (the self-proclaimed Mahdi) after his siege of Khartoum; British relief force arrives two-days later.
8 FebruaryBattle of Schuinshoogte
10 FebruaryBattle of Kirbekan
27 FebruaryBattle of Majuba Hill
30 DecemberBattle of Ginnis
1889The Maxim machine gun is introduced.
3 AugustBattle of Toski
1896
7 JuneBattle of Ferkeh
1898
8 AprilBattle of Atbara
2 SeptemberBattle of Omdurman
24 NovemberBattle of Umm Diwaykarat

1899–1918

Second Boer War
1899
11 OctoberWar is declared.
20 OctoberThe first major battle of the war takes place at Talana Hill.
December"Black Week", in which the Army suffered a series of defeats, takes place.
1900
28 FebruaryThe siege of Ladysmith is lifted.
1 AprilThe Irish Guards is formed in honour of the Irish regiments in the Boer War.
17 MayThe siege of Mafeking comes to an end.
1902
31 MayWar ends with the signing of the Treaty of Vereeniging.
1905The 5th Battalion, The Royal Garrison Regiment is the last British battalion to leave Canada.
1908The Territorial Force (later Army) is formed.
1911
1 AprilFollowing an order issued on 28 February, the Air Battalion Royal Engineers is formed.
1912The Vickers machine gun is introduced into the Army; it remains in service until 1968.
13 MayThe Air Battalion Royal Engineers becomes the Royal Flying Corps. It remains part of the Army.

First World War
1914
4 AugustBritain declares war on Germany.
AugustBritish Expeditionary Force begins to deploy to France.
19 OctoberThe First Battle of Ypres begins in Belgium.
1915
26 FebruaryThe Welsh Guards becomes the last Foot Guards regiment to be formed.
25 AprilLandings at Helles, Gallipoli.
10 AugustLandings at Suvla Bay, Gallipoli.
22 OctoberThe Machine Gun Corps is formed.
1916
AprilThe Easter Rising in Dublin takes place .
1 JulyThe First Day of the Somme begins; about 60,000 casualties are incurred, 20,000 of whom had been killed.
1917
28 JulyThe Heavy Branch of the Machine Gun Corps is split off to form the Tank Corps (later the Royal Tank Regiment).
8 NovemberAbout 200 men of the Warwickshire Yeomanry and Worcestershire Yeomanry charge with sabres drawn and defeat an Ottoman battery and a large group of Ottoman infantry at Huj. It was one of the last cavalry charges by the British Army.
20 NovemberThe Battle of Cambrai begins; sees the first large-scale use of tanks.
DecemberThe Capture of Jerusalem takes place.
1918
11 NovemberThe First World War ends with the signing of the Armistice.

1918–1945

Interwar Period

January 1919Anglo-Irish War begins; British forces combat guerilla operations by the Irish Republican Army.
1919British Army takes part in Allied intervention during Russian Civil War.
28 June 1920Winston Churchill as the Secretary of State for War signed the Royal Warrant which gave the Sovereigns approval for the formation of a 'Corps of Signals'. Six weeks later in August, King George V conferred the title 'Royal Corps of Signals'.
31 July 1922Six Irish regiments (5 infantry and one cavalry) are disbanded due to the establishment of the Irish Free State.
1929The British Army of the Rhine in Germany is withdrawn.
1935Abyssinian Crisis takes place; Army deploys substantial reinforcements to Africa and the Middle East.
1936uprising in Palestine begins.
4 April 1939The Royal Armoured Corps is formed.

Second World War

3 September 1939Britain enters the Second World War when it declares war, along with its Allies, on Nazi Germany.
September 1939British Expeditionary Force begins to land in France.
17 May 1940The Local Defence Volunteers (later the Home Guard) is formed.
20 May 1940– In France, British armoured units counter-attack at Arras.
26 May 1940The Dunkirk evacuation begins; over 330,000 British and French soldiers are evacuated by 4 June.
22 June 1940The Parachute Corps (later The Parachute Regiment) is formed.
April 1941Germany invades Crete; Army and Commonwealth forces eventually evacuated by Royal Navy.
25 December 1941The garrison at Hong Kong surrenders to the Japanese.
15 February 1942Singapore garrison surrenders to Japanese forces.
23 October 1942Second Battle of El Alamein takes place; Montgomery's British Eighth Army defeats the Afrika Korps in offensive.
10 July 1943The Allied invasion of Sicily begins.
3 September 1943Invasion of Italian mainland begins.
March 1944The Japanese launch their offensive against India; battles of Imphal and Kohima takes place.
1 April 1944The Special Air Service Regiment is formed to administer existing SAS units.
6 June 1944in airborne operations prior to D-Day landings, Pegasus and Horsa Bridges are taken by D Company, 2nd Ox & Bucks, and the Merville gun battery is destroyed by the 9th Parachute Battalion.
6 June 1944The D-Day landings take place; British Army lands at Gold and Sword; some British units allocated to Canadian beach at Juno.
18 July 1944Allied armoured offensive, Operation Goodwood, begins.
September 1944Operation Market Garden takes place.
24 March 1945Airborne crossing of the Rhine, Operation Varsity, takes place.
8 May 1945VE Day.
2 September 1945Formal surrender of Japan.

1945–1990
1 January 1948Four Gurkha regiments are transferred from the Indian Army to the British Army, forming the Brigade of Gurkhas.
28 February 1948The 1st Battalion, Somerset Light Infantry becomes the last British regiment to leave India.
1948The Malayan Emergency begins.
1948The Army withdraws from Palestine.
1 January 1949National Service, the new name for conscription, is introduced.
1 February 1949The Women's Royal Army Corps is formed.
1950The Korean War begins.
22 April 1951The Battle of the Imjin River takes place.
1952The Mau Mau uprising in Kenya begins.
1953The Army withdraws its garrison from Bermuda.
1954The last troops leave Trieste, having been there since 1945 as part of British Forces Element Trieste.
1955Occupying troops leave upon Austrian independence.
June 1956Last British troops leave the Suez Canal Zone, Egypt.
31 October 1956Operation Musketeer, the invasion of Suez begins.
5 November3rd Battalion, The Parachute Regiment dropped at El Gamil airfield.
6 NovemberAmphibious landings take place; Army Centurion tanks land in support.
1 September 1957The Army Air Corps is formed.
1957The Sandys Review of the armed forces takes place.
16 July 1958Independent Parachute Brigade Group (less 3 Para), air-landed in Amman, Jordan from Cyprus. 
1961Army deploys troops to Kuwait after its request for British to deter invasion by Iraq.
1962The Brunei uprising takes place.
1963Last National Serviceman is discharged from the Army.
1967Withdrawal from Aden after a period of time known as the Aden Emergency.
1968The only year in the century when the British Army lost no soldiers in action.
August 1969British troops deployed to Northern Ireland to assist in stopping sectarian violence. It is the beginning of "The Troubles".
5 May 1980Special Air Service ends the Iranian Embassy siege.
2 April 1982Falklands War begins.
28 May2nd Battalion, The Parachute Regiment (2 Para) defeat Argentinians at Goose Green.
8 JuneBombing of RFA's Sir Galahad, Sir Tristram kills 48, including 32 Welsh Guards.
12 June3 Para defeats the Argentinians at Mount Longdon.
14 June2 Para takes Wireless Ridge.
14 June2nd Battalion, Scots Guards defeat Argentinians at Mount Tumbledown.
14 JuneFalkland Islands are liberated upon the surrender of Argentinian forces.

1990–present
1991 The Gulf War begins; Army contributes 28,000 troops.
1991The last British Army regiment leaves Gibraltar. The Gibraltar Regiment is subsequently placed on the Army's regular establishment.
6 April 1992the WRAC was disbanded and its members integrated into various British Army units.
1 October 1992I (BR) Corps is disbanded and replaced by the Allied Command Europe Rapid Reaction Corps.
1992British forces deployed to Bosnia as part of UNPROFOR.
31 March 1994The British Army of the Rhine is disbanded and replaced by British Forces Germany.
1994The main force of the Army garrison in Belize is withdrawn; small detachment remains as part of British Army Training and Support Unit Belize.
19941st Battalion, The Queen's Lancashire Regiment becomes the last British battalion to leave Berlin.
30 June 19971st Battalion, The Black Watch (Royal Highland Regiment) becomes the last British unit to leave Hong Kong.
1998The Strategic Defence Review white paper is published.
1999Kosovo War begins.
20002 PARA arrived in Freetown, Sierra Leone to evacuate British, Commonwealth and EU citizens.
2000The Army deploys to the Republic of Macedonia.
7 October 2001U.S. invasion of Afghanistan begins. The SAS was, initially, the main Army contribution.
December 2001Major-General John McColl takes command of ISAF in Afghanistan.
20 March 2003The US-led invasion of Iraq begins.
27 March 2003The largest tank engagement by the British Army since WWII takes place; 14 Challenger 2 tanks of the Royal Scots Dragoon Guards destroy 14 Iraqi T-55s.
6 April 2003British forces, led by 7 Armoured Brigade (known as 'The Desert Rats') enter Iraq's second city of Basra.
2004The defence white paper "Delivering Security in a Changing World" is published.
March 2005Private Johnson Beharry of the 1st Battalion, Princess of Wales's Royal Regiment is awarded the Victoria Cross for his actions in Iraq in 2004.
6 April 2005The Special Reconnaissance Regiment became operational.

Notes

History of the British Army
British Army
British Army